Aesopida malasiaca is a species of beetle in the family Cerambycidae. It was described by James Thomson in 1864. It is known from Borneo, Java, Laos, Thailand, Malaysia, Vietnam, and Sumatra. It feeds on Bombax ceiba, Mallotus philippensis, and Kydia calycina.

References

Mesosini
Beetles described in 1864